Massachusetts House of Representatives' 15th Suffolk district in the United States is one of 160 legislative districts included in the lower house of the Massachusetts General Court. It covers part of Brookline in Norfolk County and part of Boston in Suffolk County. Democrat Nika Elugardo of Jamaica Plain has represented the district since 2019.

The current district geographic boundary overlaps with those of the Massachusetts Senate's 1st Middlesex and Norfolk district, Norfolk and Suffolk district, and 2nd Suffolk district.

Representatives
 Michael Garity, circa 1888 
 Frank Forrest Woods, circa 1888 
 William A. Canty, circa 1920 
 James J. Mulvey, circa 1920 
 John Joseph Beades, circa 1951 
 Francis Xavier Joyce, circa 1951 
 John P. McMorrow (1953–1957)
 George V. Kenneally Jr. (1957–1963)
 Royal L. Bolling, Jr., circa 1975 
 Kevin Fitzgerald, circa 2002
 Jeffrey Sanchez, January 2003 – January 2019
 Nika Elugardo, 2019-2023
 Sam Montaño, 2023-present

See also
 List of Massachusetts House of Representatives elections
 Other Suffolk County districts of the Massachusetts House of Representatives: 1st, 2nd, 3rd, 4th, 5th, 6th, 7th, 8th, 9th, 10th, 11th, 12th, 13th, 14th, 16th, 17th, 18th, 19th
 List of Massachusetts General Courts
 List of former districts of the Massachusetts House of Representatives

Images
Portraits of legislators

References

External links
 Ballotpedia
  (State House district information based on U.S. Census Bureau's American Community Survey).
 League of Women Voters of Brookline
 League of Women Voters of Boston

House
Government of Suffolk County, Massachusetts
Government of Norfolk County, Massachusetts